Magic Shadows was a 30-min Canadian television series produced by the TVOntario public television network hosted by Elwy Yost that ran on weekday evenings from 1974 to the mid 1980s.

The format was that the host would present classic feature films in a serialized format over the week from Monday to Friday. In addition, Yost presented material related to the film in question such as interviews, and visits to interesting places in Ontario that related to the featured film.

When the main film was concluded early, the Friday night airing would present classic film serials such as the acclaimed productions from Republic Studios such as The Adventures of Captain Marvel, Mysterious Doctor Satan, Daredevils of the Red Circle and Captain America.

References

External links

1974 Canadian television series debuts
TVO original programming
Canadian motion picture television series